Schroon Lake Airport  is a public-use airport located two nautical miles (3.7 km) north of the central business district of Schroon Lake, a town in Essex County, New York, United States. It is owned by the Town of Schroon Lake. This airport is included in the FAA's National Plan of Integrated Airport Systems for 2009–2013, which categorized it as a general aviation facility.

Facilities and aircraft 
It has one runway designated 16/34 with an asphalt surface measuring 3,000 by 60 feet (914 x 18 m). For the 12-month period ending December 8, 2007, the airport had 800 general aviation aircraft operations, an average of 66 per month.

References

External links 
  airport diagram from New York State DOT
 Aerial image as of 7 May 1995 from USGS The National Map
 

Airports in New York (state)
Transportation buildings and structures in Essex County, New York
Adirondacks